Molise is one of the 29 constituencies represented in the Chamber of Deputies, the lower house of the Italian parliament. The constituency currently elects 3 deputies, less than any other except Aosta Valley. Its boundaries correspond to those of the Italian region of Molise. The electoral system uses a parallel voting system, which act as a mixed system, with 37% of seats allocated using a first-past-the-post electoral system and 61% using a proportional method, with one round of voting. 

The constituency was first established by the Mattarella law on 4 August 1993 and later confirmed by the Calderoli law on 21 December 2005 and by the Rosato law on 3 November 2017.

Members of the Parliament

2018–present

References

Chamber of Deputies constituencies in Italy
1993 establishments in Italy
Constituencies established in 1993
Politics of Italy
Politics of Molise